Stenotrophomonas nitritireducens is a yellow-pigmented bacteria, named after its quality to reduce nitrite. It is a common soil bacteria. Its type strain is L2T (= DSM 12575T).

Stenotrophomonas nitritireducens has the ability to transform unsaturated fatty acids into hydroxy fatty acids.  Hydroxy acids are incredibly important as they are the precursors of dicarboxylic acids and lactones and are one of the starting substances of polymers.

References

Further reading

Ramos, Patrícia Locosque, et al. "An MLSA-based online scheme for the rapid identification of Stenotrophomonas isolates." Memórias do Instituto Oswaldo Cruz 106.4 (2011): 394–399.

External links

LPSN
Type strain of Stenotrophomonas nitritireducens at BacDive -  the Bacterial Diversity Metadatabase

Xanthomonadales
Gram-negative bacteria
Bacteria described in 2000